Sabka Sai is an Indian web series directed by Ajit Bhairavkar. The series stars Raj Arjun, Mohammad Samad, Akash Sinha, Gulki Joshi, Rohit Phalke and Manoj Kolhatkar. The series is going to be released on 26 August 2021.

Cast
Raj Arjun as Shirdi Sai Baba
Mohammad Samad as Young Sai Baba
Aakash Sinha as Jagya
Gulki Joshi as Kajri
Rohit Phalke as Om
Manoj Kolhatkar as Vaidyaraj Kulkarni 
Asheesh Kapur as Toddywala

Release
The official trailer of the web series was launched on 17 August 2021 by MX Player on YouTube.

References

External links

2021 web series debuts
Hindi-language web series
Indian web series
MX Player original programming